"I Am Stretched on Your Grave" is a translation of an anonymous 17th-century Irish poem titled "Táim sínte ar do thuama". It was translated into English several times, most notably by Frank O'Connor.

"Taim Sinte ar do Thuamba", has been paired with music in at least two unrelated works: in Hymn #47 of Danta De: Idir Sean agus Nuad (the Trinity Sunday hymn "Dia an t-Athair do shealbhaig flaitheas naomhtha", 1928), credited to Munster, and in "I Am Stretched on Your Grave" by musician Philip King in 1979.

The popular and current versions are influenced or rely heavily on the adapted version by King, which was recorded on the group Scullion's first album from 1979 on the Mulligan Records label (called Scullion), and titled "I Am Stretched on Your Grave".

Album recordings

References

Irish folk songs
Irish poems
Year of song unknown
Songs based on poems
Sinéad O'Connor songs
Songwriter unknown